Family resemblance refers to physical similarities shared between close relatives, especially between parents and children and between siblings. In psychology, the similarities of personality are also observed.

Genetics
Heritability, defined as a measure of family resemblance, causes traits to be genetically passed from parents to offspring (heredity), allowing evolutionarily advantageous traits to persist through generations. Despite sharing parents, siblings do not inherit identical genes, making studies on identical twins (who have identical DNA) especially effective at analyzing the role genetics play in phenotypic similarity.  Studies have found that generational resemblance of many phenotypic traits results from the inheritance of multiples genes that collectively influence a trait (additive genetic variance). There is evidence of heritability in personality traits. For example, one study found that approximately half of personality differences in high-school aged fraternal and identical twins were due to genetic variation - and another study suggests that no one personality trait is more heritable than another.

Environment
Family resemblance is also shaped by environmental factors, temperature, light, nutrition, exposure to drugs, the time that different family members spend in shared and non-shared environments, are examples of factors found to influence phenotype.  Phenotypes found to be largely environmentally determined in humans include personality, height, and weight. Twin studies have shown that more than half of the variation in a few major aspects of personality are environmentally determined, and that environmental factors even affect traits like immune response and how children handle stress. Additionally, anomalous findings, such as second-degree relatives of alcoholics, showing surprising similarities to them have led some researchers’ attempts in generating better models that account for the environmental impacts on influences like cultural inheritance, family structure and head of household, which have been shown to influence family resemblance.

See also 
Biological Anthropology
Twins
Look alike
Heredity

References

Bibliography

 
 

Anthropology
Classical genetics
Human development
Personality